2003–04 Bosnia and Herzegovina Football Cup was the tenth season of the Bosnia and Herzegovina's annual football cup, and a fourth season of the unified competition. The competition started on 17 September 2003 with the First Round and concluded on 26 May 2004 with the Final.

First round
Thirty-two teams entered in the First Round. The matches were played on 17 September 2003.

|}

Second round
The 16 winners from the prior round enter this round. The first legs were played on 22 and 29 October and the second legs were played on 5 November 2003.
 

|}

Quarterfinals
The eight winners from the prior round enter this round. The first legs were played on 19 November and the second legs were played on 22 and 29 November 2003. 

|}

Semifinals
The four winners from the prior round enter this round. The first legs will be played on 17 March and the second legs were played on 17 April 2004.

|}

Final

See also
 2003–04 Premier League of Bosnia and Herzegovina

External links
Statistics on RSSSF

Bosnia and Herzegovina Football Cup seasons
Cup
Bosnia